It Seems is the fifth studio album by Colin Newman, lead singer of post-punk band Wire. It was released in 1988 by Crammed Discs.

It Seems built on the reflective and highly orchestrated of his 1986 album Commercial Suicide, albeit with far more use of sequencers – something Newman would continue to work with for a number of years. Both Commercial Suicide and It Seems featured Malka Spigel, who married Newman in 1986, and who has been included in all subsequent solo and collaborative work.

Critical reception 
The album received positive reviews. Jim Derogatis and Wilson Neate, writing in Trouser Press, said that It Seems built on what they called the "spacious, minimalist approach" of Newman's 1986 album Commercial Suicide, saying that It Seems "refines this sound and has several songs ('Quite Unrehearsed,' 'Round & Round' and the title track) that are as striking as anything Wire recorded." Neate, writing for AllMusic, noted the album's "serene, reflective quality" and said that it "laid the foundation" for Newman's subsequent exploration of electronic music. Option magazine called it "dreamily beautiful."

Track listing

Personnel 
 Colin Newman –  instruments, vocals
 Malka Spigel – instruments, vocals
 John Bonnar – instruments, vocals
 Robert Gotobed – drums
 Luc van Lieshout – trumpet
 Rino Christ – French horn
 Jean-Paul Danhier – trombone
 Marc Hollander – clarinet
 Engineered by Giles Martin
 Produced by Colin Newman and Giles Martin

References

External links 
 

1988 albums
Colin Newman albums
Post-punk albums by English artists
Crammed Discs albums